Urpeth (Urpeth Grange) is a village in County Durham, England. It is situated a short distance from Ouston and Beamish, near the border with Tyne and Wear. The parish population taken at the 2011 census was 3,630.

Urpeth started its life as a coal mining area with multiple seams of coal being mined from various locations around the current housing estate. Urpeth Colliery was owned by the Birtley Iron Company and during its heyday employed 300 men and boys. The on site coke ovens produced up to 470 tons of coke each day.

Geographically Urpeth is situated to the west of Ouston and is surrounded by fields and rolling hills. Standing in Urpeth's only play park, one cannot see Ouston as there is a hill which blocks the view. 
This hill was formed from the coal spoils from both the Ouston and Urpeth collieries. 
The hill provides local children with an area for sledging during winter and dog walkers throughout the year.

There are currently two main businesses run within Urpeth which is the "Spar" Newsagents and The Cherry Tree pub.

Urpeth was once host to a controversial landfill site to the south west of its main location. The site was used for the disposal of low level radioactive waste along with three other sites at Kibblesworth, Ryton and Cowpen Bewley. However, since the late 1990s the site was closed and a methane burner sits on the site.

References

Villages in County Durham